Cerobates elegans is a species of beetles belonging to the family Brentidae, the straight-snouted weevils. It is found in Africa.

References

External links 

 
 Cerobates elegans at ITIS

Brentidae
Beetles described in 1963
Insects of Africa